Irby is a surname. Notable people with the surname include:

 Anthony Irby (died 1625), English Master of Chancery, Recorder and MP of Boston
 Anthony Irby (1577–1610), English politician
 Anthony Irby (1605–1682), English Member of Parliament for Boston
 Charles Irby, software architect 
 Charles Leonard Irby (1789-1845), explorer and writer, son of Frederick Irby, 2nd Baron Boston 
 Edward Irby (1676–1718), English Member of Parliament
 Frederick Paul Irby (1779–1844), Royal Navy officer and son of Frederick Irby, 2nd Baron Boston
 Henry Irby (1807–1879), founder of Buckhead, Atlanta, Georgia
 Howard Irby (1836–1905), British ornithologist and army officer
 John L. M. Irby (1854–1900), US Senator representing South Carolina
 John R. Irby, editor of the Bismarck Tribune
 Joyce Irby, bassist and co-lead vocalist of Klymaxx
 Lee Irby (born 1963), American novelist and historian
 Lynna Irby (born 1998), American sprinter
 Kenneth Irby (born 1936), American poet
 Margaret Irby (1884–1950), English socialite, Countess of Kimberley
 Michael Irby (born 1972), American film and television actor
 Nathan Irby (born 1931 or 1932), American former politician
 Paulina Irby (1831–1911), British travel writer, suffragist and philanthropist
 Samantha Irby, African-American blogger, comedian and author
 Sherman Irby, jazz alto saxophonist

English toponymic surnames